Baron Louis Gerard De Geer af Finspång (18 July 181824 September 1896) was a Swedish statesman and writer. He was born at Finspång Castle in Risinge parish. He was a lawyer, and in 1855 became president of the Göta hovrätt, or lord justice for the appellate court of Götaland. From 7 April 1858 to 3 June 1870 he was Prime Minister for Justice and again from 11 May 1875 to 20 March 1876. As a member of the nobility, he took part in the Swedish Riksdag of the Estates from 1851 onwards. From 1867 to 1878 he was the member for Stockholm in the first chamber in the New Riksdag, where he introduced and passed many useful reforms.

Architect of the New Riksdag 
De Geer's greatest political achievement was the reform of the Swedish representative system. The reforms introduced a bi-cameral elected Riksdag replacing the existing cumbersome and less democratic Riksdag of the Estates, a hangover from the later Medieval Times. This measure was accepted by the Riksdag in December 1865, and received the royal sanction on 22 June 1866. For some time after this De Geer enjoyed considerable popularity. He retired from the ministry in 1870, but took office again, as Prime Minister of Justice in 1875.

First Prime Minister 
In 1876 De Geer became the first Prime Minister of Sweden following a reform where the previous offices of Prime Minister for Justice (which he held at the time) and Prime Minister for Foreign Affairs were changed into Minister for Justice and a Minister for Foreign Affairs. He served until April 1880, when the failure of his repeated efforts to settle the armaments issue again induced him to resign. From 1881 to 1888 he was Chancellor for the Universities of Uppsala and Lund. He was an advocate of free trade and economic liberalism.  Some argue that it was De Geer who laid the foundations for the strong economic growth in Sweden from 1870 to 1970.

Literary works 
Besides several novels and aesthetic essays, De Geer wrote a few political memoirs of supreme merit both as to style and matter, the most notable of which are Minnesteckning öfver A. J. v. Höpken (Stockholm, 1881); Minnesteckning öfver Hans Järta (Stockholm, 1874); Minnesteckning öfver B. B. von Platen (Stockholm, 1886); and his own Minnen (Stockholm, 1892), an autobiography, invaluable as a historical document, in which the political experience and the matured judgments of a lifetime are recorded with singular clearness, sobriety and charm. For example, his explanation of why he, at such a young age, was appointed Prime Minister of Justice, was that in the narrow circles of Swedish nobility at the time, it was difficult to find anyone with at least the mediocre intelligence which was needed for the office.

Membership in academies 
De Geer was a member in the Swedish Academy from 1862, on Seat 17. In 1862, he was also elected a member of the Royal Swedish Academy of Sciences.

Personal life
In 1848, De Geer married the countess Carolina Lovisa Wachtmeister. They had three sons, of which the eldest, Gerhard Louis De Geer (1854–1935), was prime minister of Sweden from 1920 to 21 and the second was Gerard De Geer (1858–1943), a geologist.

De Geer died on 24 September 1896 at his residence Hanaskog Castle in Scania. He is buried in the cemetery of Kviinge Church.

References

1818 births
1896 deaths
People from Finspång Municipality
Members of the Första kammaren
Members of the Swedish Academy
Prime Ministers of Sweden
Swedish Ministers for Justice
Swedish nobility
Uppsala University alumni
Members of the Royal Swedish Academy of Sciences
19th-century Swedish politicians
Swedish people of Belgian descent
Louis Gerhard
Members of the Riksdag of the Estates